David Cory may refer to:

David Cory (author) (1872–1966), American children's author
David G. Cory, Canadian chemist and physicist
David Cory (politician) (born 1928),  member of the Queensland Legislative Assembly